Puka Urqu (Quechua puka red, urqu mountain, "red mountain",  Hispanicized spelling Pucaorcco) is a mountain in the Andes of Peru, about  high . It is situated in the Cusco Region, Canchis Province, Combapata District. Puka Urqu lies northwest of Inka Pirqa. The Llanqha Mayu (or Sallqa Mayu) flows along its slopes. It is a right affluent of the Willkanuta River.

References

Mountains of Cusco Region
Mountains of Peru